Cornelis Jan Bakker (11 March 1904 – 23 April 1960) was a Dutch physicist and second Director General of CERN. He was also a member of the Royal Netherlands Academy of Sciences.

Biography 

Bakker studied physics at the University of Amsterdam under Pieter Zeeman.

In 1931 he obtained his doctorate. His doctoral thesis dealt with the effects of Zeeman effect on spectral lines of noble gases. The next year he spent at the Imperial College of Science in London, where he continued his research in the area of spectroscopy.

In 1933 he worked for the scientific department of Philips in Eindhoven, where he was active in the field of wireless technology. In the following his interest in nuclear physics grow and he started during World War II in cooperation with August Heyn with the development of a cyclotron for Philips.

After the war Bakker replaced Gorter as a professor of physics and director of the Zeeman Laboratory at the University of Amsterdam in 1946. In addition, he became director of the Institute for Nuclear Physics of Amsterdam and the company Philips, which, sponsored by the  Netherlands Organisation for Scientific Research  (NWO), formed the center of nuclear physics research in the Netherlands.

In 1951, Bakker was invited by Professor Pierre Auger (then director of the scientific department of UNESCO) to join a group of eight experts which should make plans about the future CERN. He is considered one of the founders of the CERN. A year later (1952) he became director of a group responsible for the design and construction of the Synchro-Cyclotron (CERN) (SC). Then he was appointed as director of the Synchro-Cyclotron department. In 1952 Bakker became member of the Royal Netherlands Academy of Arts and Sciences, three years later he became foreign member.

In 1955, he replaced Felix Bloch as the Director General of the CERN. He was then 5 years in office until he died in 1960 in a plane crash. During his funeral  Bakker's work and commitment to CERN and science was repeatedly touted by politicians and researchers, such as John Adams (his successor as director general) or Jo Cals. In addition, he was awarded the Order of the Netherlands Lion by the former Queen of the Netherlands Juliana.

References

External links 
  CERN Courier, Farewell to Prof. Bakker
  CERN Courier, In memory of Prof. Bakker
  Professor C.J. Bakker (siehe PDF)

1904 births
1960 deaths
20th-century Dutch physicists
People associated with CERN
Philips employees
Members of the Royal Netherlands Academy of Arts and Sciences
Scientists from Amsterdam
University of Amsterdam alumni
Academic staff of the University of Amsterdam